Heydarlu may refer to:
 Heydarlu, Urmia
 Heydarlu, Nazlu, Urmia County
 Heydarlu-ye Beyglar, Nazlu District, Urmia County